Kilvington is a hamlet and civil parish in Nottinghamshire, England, part of the Newark and Sherwood district.

Dr Robert Thoroton in Antiquities of Nottinghamshire mentions enclosure 'about the Year 1750', but an Act of Parliament to enclose about 400 acres was passed in 1804 and the Award, mentioning 410 acres of the township of  Alverton in Staunton, together with Kilvington, is dated 1810.
 
It is combined with its neighbouring parish of Alverton to form an area for a parish meeting. Population information is included in the civil parish of Staunton.

References

External links
 
 
 Alverton & Kilvington Parish Meeting

Villages in Nottinghamshire
Newark and Sherwood